5,8-linoleate diol synthase may refer to:
 Linoleate 8R-lipoxygenase, an enzyme
 9,12-octadecadienoate 8-hydroperoxide 8R-isomerase, an enzyme